The 2021 World Junior Figure Skating Championships were scheduled to be held from March 1–7, 2021 in Harbin, China. Figure skaters would have competed for the title of junior world champion in men's singles, ladies' singles, pairs, and ice dance. The competition would have determined the entry quotas for each federation during the 2021–22 ISU Junior Grand Prix series and at the 2022 World Junior Championships.

Harbin was announced as the host in October 2018. It would have been China's first time hosting Junior Worlds. On November 24, 2020, the International Skating Union announced the cancellation of the event, citing "the pandemic developments and related impact on the organizers and participants." The event had never been cancelled before.

Impact of the COVID-19 pandemic 
On July 9, the General Administration of Sport of China announced that no international sporting events would be held in China in 2020, except for 2022 Winter Olympics test events. At the time, it was unclear whether the order could extend into affecting 2021 events. The Chinese Skating Association was scheduled to host several events during the season, including the World Junior Championships. Earlier in the season, the CSA was the only federation to host a wholly domestic Grand Prix event, the 2020 Cup of China, due to the country's stringent quarantine restrictions during the COVID-19 pandemic.

On July 20, the 2020–21 ISU Junior Grand Prix series was cancelled. With the cancellation of Junior Worlds, there was effectively no season for juniors during the 2020–21 season. However, several juniors who were age-eligible for seniors competed on the senior Grand Prix and/or the 2020–21 ISU Challenger Series instead.

The World Junior Championships were the second ISU Championship event during the 2020–21 season to be cancelled, following the cancellation of the 2021 Four Continents Championships on October 16. The ISU and various host federations had additionally cancelled several other events earlier in the season, including the Junior Grand Prix series, half of the Challenger Series events, and two Grand Prix events.

Qualification

Age and minimum TES requirements
Skaters who reach the age of 13 before July 1, 2020, but have not turned 19 (singles and females of the other two disciplines) or 21 (male pair skaters and ice dancers) are eligible to compete at the junior level.

The ISU stipulates that the minimum scores must be achieved at an ISU-recognized junior international competition in the ongoing or preceding season, no later than 21 days before the first official practice day.

Number of entries per discipline 
Based on the results of the 2020 World Junior Championships, each ISU member nation can field one to three entries per discipline.

Schedule

Entries 
Member nations had yet to announce their selections at the time of cancellation.

References

External links 
 2021 World Junior Championships at the International Skating Union

World Junior Figure Skating Championships
World Junior Figure Skating Championships
World Junior Figure Skating Championships
World Junior Figure Skating Championships
International figure skating competitions hosted by China
World Junior Figure Skating Championships
World Junior Figure Skating Championships